Daniel Tracy (December 8, 1843 – October 2, 1919) was an American farmer, businessman, and politician.

Tracy was born in King's County, Ireland. He emigrated to the United States and settled in the town of Liberty, Manitowoc County, Wisconsin in 1854. Tracy went to the public schools in Manitowoc County. Tracy was a farmer and owned a hotel. He lived in Osman, Wisconsin. Tracy served on the Liberty Town Board and was chairman of the town board. Tracy also served on the school board and the Manitowoc County Board of Supervisors. Tracy served in the Wisconsin Assembly in 1887 and 1888 and was a Democrat. Tracy died in Manitowoc, Wisconsin.

Notes

External links

1843 births
1919 deaths
Irish emigrants to the United States (before 1923)
People from County Offaly
People from Manitowoc County, Wisconsin
Businesspeople from Wisconsin
Farmers from Wisconsin
Mayors of places in Wisconsin
Wisconsin city council members
School board members in Wisconsin
County supervisors in Wisconsin
People from Meeme, Wisconsin
Democratic Party members of the Wisconsin State Assembly